Ekaterina Orlova (born 21 October 1987) is a former Russian female volleyball player, playing as a middle-blocker. She was part of the Russia women's national volleyball team.

She participated in the 2015 FIVB Volleyball World Grand Prix.
She won the gold medal at the 2015 Women's European Volleyball Championship. On club level she plays for Volero Zurich, in Switzerland.

References

External links
 

1987 births
Living people
Middle blockers
Russian women's volleyball players
Russian expatriate sportspeople in Switzerland
Sportspeople from Kaliningrad